Anne Orford  is a professor of law and an ARC Australian Laureate Fellow at the University of Melbourne.

Her main focus of research are in the areas of public international law, history and theory of international law and international economic law.

She was elected a Fellow of the Academy of Social Sciences in Australia in 2016 and is a past President of the Australian and New Zealand Society of International Law, furthermore she holds the Redmond Barry Distinguished Professor title with which the University of Melbourne "recognises and rewards outstanding leaders within the University's professoriate".

She has been awarded honorary doctorates in law by the University of Gothenburg (2012), and the University of Helsinki (2017) and the Woodward Medal for Excellence in Humanities and Social Sciences by the University of Melbourne. She was awarded the Kathleen Fitzpatrick Australian Laureate Fellowship in 2015.

Selected books 
Orford is author of several books including the following.

References 

Living people
Year of birth missing (living people)
Academic staff of the University of Melbourne
International law scholars
Economic law
Date of birth missing (living people)
Fellows of the Academy of the Social Sciences in Australia
University of Adelaide alumni